Take Me Home is a 1928 silent comedy produced by Famous Players-Lasky and distributed by Paramount Pictures. The film was directed by Marshall Neilan and starred Bebe Daniels and Neil Hamilton.

Plot
Peggy Lane joins David North's chorus but becomes jealous when she discovers that Delerys Devore, the show's star, is of interest to David more than her.

Cast
Bebe Daniels as Peggy Lane
Neil Hamilton as David North
Lilyan Tashman as Derelys Devore
Doris Hill as Alice Moore
Joe E. Brown as Bunny
Ernie Wood as Al Marks
Marcia Harris as The Landlady
Yvonne Howell as Elsie
Janet MacLeod as Betty
J.W. Johnston as The Producer

Preservation status
The film is now considered a lost film.

See also
List of lost films

References

External links

American silent feature films
Films directed by Marshall Neilan
Films based on short fiction
Lost American films
Famous Players-Lasky films
Paramount Pictures films
Films with screenplays by Herman J. Mankiewicz
1928 comedy films
Silent American comedy films
American black-and-white films
1928 lost films
Lost comedy films
1920s American films
1920s English-language films